John Midgley is an English sound engineer. He won an Oscar in the category Best Sound Mixing for Hugo and has been nominated for another two. He has worked on more than 100 films since 1977.

Selected filmography
 Xtro (1983)
 The Cold Room (1984)
 Fairly Secret Army (1984)
 Howling II: Your Sister Is a Werewolf (1985)
 Hellraiser (1987)
 Hellbound: Hellraiser II (1988)
 Diamond Skulls (1989)
 Getting It Right (1989)
 Nightbreed (1990)
 FairyTale: A True Story (1997)
 Mortal Kombat: Annihilation (1997)
 Sliding Doors (1998)
 Brokedown Palace (1999)
 Sex, Chips & Rock n' Roll (1999)
 Star Wars: Episode I – The Phantom Menace (1999)
 Saving Grace (2000)
 Harry Potter and the Philosopher's Stone (2001)
 Harry Potter and the Chamber of Secrets (2002)
 The Importance of Being Earnest (2002)
 Harry Potter and the Prisoner of Azkaban (2004)
 Children of Men (2006)
 The King's Speech (2010)
 Hugo (2011)
 The Imitation Game (2014)
 Doctor Strange (2016)
 Paddington 2 (2017)
 Phantom Thread (2017)
 Christopher Robin (2018)
 Detective Pikachu (2019)
 Pinocchio (2022)

References

External links

Year of birth missing (living people)
Living people
British audio engineers
Best Sound Mixing Academy Award winners
Best Sound BAFTA Award winners